Robert A. Martin (born November 14, 1953) is a former American football linebacker who played four seasons in the National Football League (NFL) with the New York Jets and San Francisco 49ers. He was drafted by the Jets in the sixth round of the 1976 NFL Draft. He played college football at the University of Nebraska–Lincoln and attended David City High School in David City, Nebraska.

References

External links
Just Sports Stats

Living people
1953 births
Players of American football from Nebraska
American football linebackers
Nebraska Cornhuskers football players
New York Jets players
San Francisco 49ers players
People from David City, Nebraska